The 4th Open Russian Festival of Animated Film was held in from Feb. 4-8 in 1999 at a boarding house called "Birch Grove" two kilometres from the town of Tarusa, Russia.  Animated works from the past three years from the Russian Federation were accepted. Along with auteur films, commercial reels, video clips, music videos, television bumpers and one animated series were in competition. Coming the year after the 1998 Russian financial crisis, there were fewer films than usual.

The jury prizes were tailor-made to the films in competition. Also, any member or guest of the festival was able to vote for their favourite film.

Jury

Jury prizes

Rating (by audience vote)
Each member of the audience was asked to list their top 5 five films of the festival.  5 points were given for a 1st place vote and so on, down to 1 point for a 5th place vote.

External links
Official website with the results 
Full list of competing films 

Anim
Open Russian Festival of Animated Film
1999 in animation
Russ
Russ
Russ